Moreton is a small rural village in the borough of Stafford in Staffordshire, England, near the border with Shropshire. Population details as taken at the 2011 Census can be found under Gnosall.

Description 
Two notable sites in the village are the village community hall built in 2000 and St. Mary's Church. The church of St. Mary is a stone building, in the Italian style, and was erected in 1837; it consists of chancel, transepts and nave, with tower and one bell, and seats 340 people. One other local site which is now a privately owned home is the school, which at one point had over one hundred students from Moreton and its hamlets.

Considering the size of the village (roughly 50-60 houses), the lack of more facilities is understandable.

The village is made up primarily of three roads: Heath Lane, Post Office Lane and Church Lane. Both the village hall and church are located on Church Lane, nearer to where the Lane joins Post Office Lane.

History 
Moreton ecclesiastical parish was formed on April 26, 1845, from the parish of Gnosall, although it remained in Gnosall parish for civil purposes.

Until the mid-1870s, it was referred to as a hamlet of Gnosall , and can be found, prior to 1880, described with the history of Gnosall. However, by 1880 it had developed sufficiently to be referred to separately, with its own 'satellite' hamlets: Bromstead Heath, Great Chatwell, Coley, Outwoods and Wilbrighton.

Folklorist Charlotte Burne (1850-1923) was born at Moreton Vicarage.

References

External links

Villages in Staffordshire
Borough of Stafford